The Grosvenor Bridge is a single-span stone arch road bridge crossing the River Dee at Chester, England. Located on the A483 Grosvenor Road, it was designed by Thomas Harrison and opened by Princess Victoria of Saxe-Coburg-Saalfeld on 17 October 1832. The first traffic passed over it in November 1833.

At the time of its construction, the bridge was the longest single-span stone arch bridge in the world, a title that it retained for 30 years. It is recorded in the National Heritage List for England as a designated Grade I listed building.

Views upriver include Chester Castle and Handbridge, the impressive mansions of Curzon Park and the adjacent Roodee. Water levels of the tidal Dee vary significantly during the day.

History

Design
At the beginning of the 19th century, Chester only had one river crossing, a narrow medieval bridge at Handbridge, the Old Dee Bridge. Heavily congested, it delayed movement through the town. Building a new bridge was prohibitively expensive until Thomas Telford proposed a new road between Shrewsbury and the Irish ferries at Holyhead to facilitate trade between the two islands. The route would have bypassed Chester, greatly reducing the potential income from the lucrative Irish trade routes. A committee was appointed to consider plans for a new bridge to quicken movement across the city and encourage traders to continue to stop there.

Chester was at the time a major shipbuilding city, and a very tall bridge was required to allow ships to pass underneath. When constructed, it would be the largest arch in the world, described by chief builder James Trubshaw as "a lasting monument to the glory and superiority of Great Britain". The arch is of limestone from Anglesey, the rest the bridge gritstone. Its span remains the longest masonry arch in Britain.

Construction
Original plans called for a bridge between Chester Castle and Wrexham Road. However, Harrison was concerned soft ground there would not support heavy piers. Telford found a drier area downstream and construction was moved there, requiring Wrexham Road to be deadended in one direction, the other leading to the bridge. The first stone was laid by the Marquess of Westminster on 1 October 1827.

The unfinished bridge was formally opened by Princess Victoria of Saxe-Coburg-Saalfeld and her daughter, Princess Alexandrina Victoria of Kent (later Queen Victoria), who were driven through a triumphal arch staged on its roadway to a 21-gun salute on 17 October 1832. Construction was finally completed in November 1833, and a toll imposed to pay the £50,000 construction costs, a large sum at the time. The toll proved harmful to trade and was abolished in 1885 when maintenance was transferred to the Chester Corporation.

Harrison died two years into construction; his pupil William Cole completed the job.

Photographs

See also

Grade I listed buildings in Cheshire West and Chester
List of works by Thomas Harrison

References

External links

Scalable satellite view of the Grosvenor Bridge from Google Maps

Arch bridges in the United Kingdom
Grade I listed bridges
Bridges in Cheshire
Grosvenor Bridge
Grade I listed buildings in Chester
Bridges completed in 1833
Bridges across the River Dee, Wales
Stone bridges in England
Thomas Harrison buildings
Former toll bridges in Wales